Patkule is a village in Sarkaņi parish and Madona municipality, Latvia.

Towns and villages in Latvia